The American Foundation for the Blind (AFB) is an American non-profit organization for people with vision loss. AFB's objectives include conducting research to advance change, promoting knowledge and understanding, and shaping policies and practices.

Kirk Adams, formerly the first blind president and CEO of The Lighthouse for the Blind, Inc. has been AFB's president and CEO since May 2016.

The AFB's main headquarters is in Arlington, Virginia.

History
AFB, with the support and leadership of M.C. Migel, a philanthropist who was moved to help the large number of veterans blinded in World War I, was formed in 1921 to provide both a national clearing house for information about vision loss and a forum for discussion for blindness service professionals. Its founding, made official at the convention of the American Association of Workers for the Blind in Vinton, Iowa, was also intended to spur research and represent the needs of people with vision loss in the US government.

AFB's early accomplishments included taking the lead to standardize English Braille code and establishing the first professional publications program for teachers and administrators of programs for people with vision loss. In 1926, AFB's Directory of Services for Blind and Visually Impaired Persons was first published.

In 1932, AFB engineers developed the Talking Book and Talking Book Machine and set up studios for recording these books, marking the advent of the modern audiobook. AFB played a major role in persuading the federal government to include talking books in the National Library System for blind people operated by the Library of Congress.

AFB's advocacy efforts have led to the passage of significant legislation for people with vision loss. AFB was instrumental in creating and passing the Americans with Disabilities Act of 1990 (ADA) and more recently worked on the renewal of the Individuals with Disabilities Education Act (IDEA) to ensure that it contained provisions to meet the specific needs of children with vision loss.

For many years, AFB designed, manufactured and sold products that were made specifically for people with vision loss, such as braille writers, magnifiers, and audio blood pressure monitors. AFB also works with technology manufacturers at the design stage to develop products that can be used by everyone, sighted or visually impaired. Especially since the advent of digital technology, AFB believes that working to establish universal design practices among technology producers is the most promising and cost-effective option for making all products accessible in the long term.

AFB is the organization to which Helen Keller devoted her life. She worked for AFB for more than 40 years and was instrumental in the foundation of the Talking Books Program, among many others. She remained with AFB until her death, in 1968. Under the terms of her will, she selected AFB as the repository of her papers and memorabilia, which AFB maintains in the Helen Keller Archive.

Louis Braille was the Frenchman who invented the raised dot code that bears his name. On January 4, 2009, the 200th anniversary of his birth, AFB created an online gallery that includes pictures of him and digitized books and articles.

Blind Leaders Development Program

AFB launched the Blind Leaders Development Program in 2019 with the purpose of increasing upward mobility and creating meaningful leadership experiences for individuals who are blind or low vision, who are already employed and in the beginning stages of their careers.
Every year, AFB selects a class of blind or visually impaired individuals: 50% emerging leaders as fellows and 50% established leaders to act as their mentors.

Partnership with the American Printing House for the Blind
In 2018, AFB partnered with the American Printing House for the Blind (APH) to transition several AFB programs to continue under APH’s stewardship, including AFB Press, VisionAware, FamilyConnect, CareerConnect, and BrailleBug. With these programs under APH’s oversight, AFB is investing in policy and programs focused on creating stronger social systems, and ultimately a more inclusive, accessible society for people with vision loss. )

Helen Keller Archive

In 2018, AFB launched the Helen Keller Archive, the first fully accessible digital archive collection, comprising more than 160,000 artifacts, dedicated to the life and works of Helen Keller. It is the largest repository of historical content about Helen Keller, whose iconic name is known in every corner of the globe for her groundbreaking work as an author, political activist, and humanitarian who played a critical role in changing public perceptions about people with disabilities.

VisionAware 
In 2012, AFB added VisionAware to its family of sites in partnership with the Reader's Digest Partners for Sight Foundation. The site folded in content from AFB's Senior Site, with new information and resources for adults of all ages with vision loss.

VisionAware's stated goal is to help adults and their family members to cope with age-related eye diseases, a growing public health problem in the United States. According to research on vision problems in Americans over 40, rates of vision loss from diseases like age-related macular degeneration, glaucoma and diabetic retinopathy are expected to double by 2030, as America's 78 million baby boomers reach retirement age.

In 2018, VisionAware was transferred to the American Printing House for the Blind as part of the AFB-APH partnership.

FamilyConnect 
In spring 2008, AFB and the National Association for Parents of Children with Visual Impairments (NAPVI) launched FamilyConnect, an online community for caregivers of children with visual impairments.  NAPVI is an affiliate of Lighthouse Guild. In 2018, VisionAware was transitioned to the American Printing House for the Blind as part of the AFB-APH partnership.

References

External links
 Official website
 Louis Braille Online Museum
 Periodicals
AccessWorld: "Technology and People with Visual Impairments"
 Journal of Visual Impairment & Blindness a.k.a. JVIB
 FamilyConnect
 Review of AFB website Anne Sullivan Macy at Teachinghistory.org

Health and disability rights organizations in the United States
Blindness organizations in the United States
1921 establishments in the United States